The Shaw Charity Classic is a professional golf tournament in Canada on the Champions Tour, played at Canyon Meadows Golf and Country Club in Calgary, Alberta.  

The 54-hole tournament was first played in 2013, and Rocco Mediate won with a 22-under 191, seven strokes ahead of runner-up Tom Byrum. A new course record was set by Bill Glasson at 62 (−9).

The course was changed to par 70 in 2014, with a winner's share of $337,500. Fred Couples chipped in for eagle on the par-5 final hole for a course record 61 (−9) and a total of 195 (−15), then waited for the leaders to finish. Billy Andrade followed with a 62 (−8) to force a two-man playoff, which began on the 18th hole. Couples laid up with a wedge and nearly holed his third shot with a sand wedge; he sank the one-foot (0.3 m) putt for birdie to win the title.

Winners

References

External links

Coverage on Champions Tour official site
Canyon Meadows Golf and Country Club

PGA Tour Champions events
Golf tournaments in Alberta
Sport in Calgary